Klubi i Futbollit Turbina Cërrik is an Albanian professional football club based in Cërrik, Elbasan County that competes in the Kategoria e Parë, the second tier of Albanian football. Founded in 1956 as Puna Cërrik, it was renamed to Turbina Cërrik in 1958. The club's home ground is the Nexhip Trungu Stadium in Cërrik.

History
The club was founded in 1956 as Puna Cërrik, during a period in which the majority of clubs in Albania were instructed to be named Puna, meaning work in Albanian, by the ruling Communist regime. The club was renamed Turbina Cërrik in 1958 and was an amateur club for much of its early history, playing in the lower leagues before finishing runners-up in the 1982–83 Kategoria e Dytë season and achieving promotion to the Kategoria e Parë, the second tier, for the first time in the club's history. They finished 7th out of 14 in their debut season in the Kategoria e Parë, but were subsequently relegated the following season after finishing bottom of the league the following season. Turbina returned to the second tier after winning the 1987–88 Kategoria e Dytë, the club's first-ever trophy. The club became a regular in the second-tier and consistently finished mid-table before suffering relegation after finish bottom of Group C of the 1997–98 Kategoria e Parë. The club spent four years in the Kategoria e Dytë before achieving promotion to the second-tier again in 2002, but they were relegated at the end of the 2002–03 season back to the third-tier. Turbina won the Kategoria e Dytë for the second time in 2005 and were promoted back to the Kategoria e Parë ahead of the 2005–06 Kategoria e Parë season.

Stadium

The stadium of KS Turbina Cërrik is named Nexhip Trungu Stadium. It is a multi-purpose stadium. It has a capacity of 6,600 seats.

References

Turbina Cerrik
Turbina Cerrik
Cërrik
1956 establishments in Albania
Kategoria e Dytë clubs